All Things Await is a novel written by American author Seth Clabough, published by Savant Books in June 2016. It was nominated for the Library of Virginia Literary Award for Fiction.

References

2016 American novels
2016 science fiction novels
American science fiction novels
Novels set in Costa Rica